David Joyce may refer to:

 David Joyce (businessman) (1825–1894), American lumber baron and industrialist in the 1800s
 David Joyce (politician) (born 1957), American politician and U.S. Representative from Ohio
 David C. Joyce, president of Brevard College, North Carolina
 David Oliver Joyce (born 1987), Irish boxer